Corporate Vibes is an Australian play by David Williamson. It is a satire of the corporate world. The first production was directed by Robyn Nevin who said the play was about "growing up".

Premise
A psychologist goes to work at a building company.

Reception
The Sydney Morning Herald called the 1999 production "a slight and superficial play."

References

External links

Plays by David Williamson
1999 plays